Alt-Wiener Tanzweisen (Old Viennese Melodies in German) is a set of three short pieces for violin and piano composed by Austrian-American violinist Fritz Kreisler. The three pieces are titled Liebesfreud (Love's Joy), Liebesleid (Love's Sorrow), and Schön Rosmarin (Lovely Rosemary).

It is not known when the pieces are written, but they were published in 1905, deliberately misattributed to Joseph Lanner. The pieces had become parts of Kreisler's repertoire well before September 1910, when he copyrighted them under his own name. 

Kreisler often played these pieces as encores at his concerts, though the pieces are usually performed separately. 

In 1911, he published solo piano arrangements of the pieces as Alt-Wiener Tanzweisen. The pieces have since appeared in numerous settings for other instruments, or orchestrated.

Two of the pieces, Liebesfreud and Liebesleid, were the subject of virtuoso transcriptions for solo piano by Kreisler's friend Sergei Rachmaninoff (1931), who also recorded these transcriptions.

Notes

External links

 

Compositions for violin and piano
Compositions by Fritz Kreisler
1905 compositions